Dylan Fontani (born 13 February 1997) is a French professional footballer who currently plays as a centre-back.

Professional career
Fonatni joined Toulon on 17 June 2017, from the youth academy of Montpellier HSC. On 29 July 2018, Fontani signed his first professional contract with Chamois Niortais. Fonatni made his professional with Niort in a 1-0 Coupe de la Ligue loss to LB Châteauroux on 14 August 2018.

On 1 February 2020, Fontani joined Championnat National 2 club Hyères on loan until the end of the 2019–20 season. He joined the club permanently at the end of the season and played two games in the 2020-21 season, before his contract was terminated by mutual consent on 21 October 2020.

References

External links
 
 

1997 births
Living people
People from La Seyne-sur-Mer
French footballers
Association football defenders
Chamois Niortais F.C. players
SC Toulon players
Hyères FC players
Ligue 2 players
Championnat National players
Sportspeople from Var (department)
Footballers from Provence-Alpes-Côte d'Azur